Olmedilla de Eliz is a municipality in Cuenca, Castile-La Mancha, Spain. It has a population of 21, according to census data from 2011.

References

Municipalities in the Province of Cuenca